Hypochalcia dignella is a species of snout moth in the genus Hypochalcia. It was described by Jacob Hübner in 1796. It is found in France, Austria, Slovakia, Hungary, Bosnia and Herzegovina, Romania, Bulgaria, Ukraine and Russia. It has also been recorded from Kazakhstan.

References

Moths described in 1796
Phycitini
Moths of Europe